USS Impeccable is a name used more than once by the U.S. Navy:

 , a World War II fleet minesweeper.
 , an ocean surveillance vessel placed into service on 22 March 2001.

References 

United States Navy ship names